At least two ships of the Royal Norwegian Navy have been named HNoMS Kobben:

, the first Norwegian submarine launched in 1909 and scrapped in 1933.
, a  commissioned in 1964 and transferred to Poland in 2002 as a source of spares, subsequently used for crew training

Royal Norwegian Navy ship names